Kim Young-sam (or  ; 20 December 1927 – 22 November 2015) was a South Korean politician and activist who served as the seventh president of South Korea from 1993 to 1998.

From 1961, he spent almost 30 years as one of the leaders of the South Korean opposition, and one of the most powerful rivals to the authoritarian regimes of Park Chung-hee and Chun Doo-hwan. Elected as president in 1992, Kim became the first civilian to hold the office in over 30 years. He was inaugurated on 25 February 1993, and served a single five-year term, presiding over a massive anti-corruption campaign, the arrest of his two predecessors, and an internationalization policy called Segyehwa.

At the final years of his presidency, Kim had been widely blamed for the collapse of the Seongsu Bridge and the Sampoong Department Store and 
the downturn and recession of the South Korean economy during the 1997 Asian financial crisis, which forced South Korea to accept tens of billions of dollars in unpopular conditional loans from the International Monetary Fund (IMF). This caused him to have one of the lowest approval ratings of any incumbent president in the history of South Korea at 6%, until Park Geun-hye surpassed Kim at 1–3% during the political scandal in 2016.

Early life and education

Kim was born in Geoje Island, at the southeastern tip of the Korean Peninsula, to a rich fishing family on 20 December 1927, in Korea under Japanese rule. He was the eldest of one son and five daughters in his family. During the Korean War, Kim served in the South Korean military as a student soldier (or Officer candidate). In 1952, he graduated with a Bachelor of Arts in Philosophy from Seoul National University.

Early political career
In 1954, Kim was elected to the National Assembly of South Korea, as a member of the party led by Syngman Rhee, the first president of South Korea. At the time of his election, Kim was the youngest member of the national assembly. A few months after his electoral victory, Kim left his party and joined the opposition when Rhee attempted to amend the constitution of South Korea. Kim then became a leading critic, along with Kim Dae-jung, of the military governments of Park Chung-hee and Chun Doo-hwan.

In 1969, Kim fiercely opposed the constitutional revision to allow President Park to serve for three consecutive terms. Kim later opposed President Park's power grab with the authoritarian Yushin Constitution of 1972.

In 1971, Kim made his first attempt to run for president against Park as candidate for the opposition New Democratic Party, but Kim Dae-jung was selected as the candidate.

New Democratic Party leader

In 1974, he was elected as the president of the New Democratic Party. While he temporarily lost his power within the national assembly in 1976, Kim made a political comeback during the final year of Park Chung-hee's rule. Kim took a hardline policy of never compromising or cooperating with Park's Democratic Republican Party until the Yushin Constitution was repealed and boldly criticized Park's dictatorship, which could be punished with imprisonment under the new constitution.

In August 1979, Kim allowed around 200 female workers at the Y.H. Trading Company to use the headquarters of New Democratic Party as a place for their sit-in demonstration and pledged to protect them. One thousand policemen raided the party headquarters and arrested the workers. One female worker died in the process and many lawmakers trying to protect them were severely beaten, some requiring hospitalization. The YH Incident garnered widespread criticism and led to Kim's condemnation, with an assertion that Park's dictatorship would soon collapse. After this incident, Park was determined to remove Kim from the political scene, like the imprisoned Kim Dae-jung, and instructed the South Korean Central Intelligence Agency (KCIA) to engineer such a move. In September 1979, a court order suspended Kim's presidency of the New Democratic Party.

When Kim called on the United States to stop supporting Park's dictatorship in an interview with the New York Times, Park wanted to have Kim imprisoned while the Carter Administration, concerned over increasing human right violations, issued a strong warning not to persecute members of the opposition party. Kim was expelled from the National Assembly in October 1979, and the United States recalled its ambassador back to Washington, D.C., and all 66 lawmakers of the New Democratic Party resigned from the National Assembly.

When it became known that the South Korean government was planning to accept the resignations selectively, uprisings broke out in Kim's hometown of Busan. It was the biggest demonstration since the Syngman Rhee presidency, and spread to nearby Masan and other cities, with students and citizens calling for an end to the dictatorship. The Bu-Ma Democratic Protests caused a crisis, and amidst this chaos Park Chung-hee was assassinated on 26 October 1979 by KCIA Director Kim Jae-gyu.

House arrest
The government's oppressive stance towards the opposition continued under Chun Doo-hwan, who seized power with a military coup on 12 December 1979. Kim Young-Sam was expelled from the National Assembly for his democratic activities and banned from politics from 1980 to 1985. In May 1983, he undertook a 21-day hunger strike protesting the dictatorship of Chun Doo-hwan.

Failed presidential run: 1987
When the first democratic presidential election was held in 1987 after Chun's retirement, Kim Young-sam and Kim Dae-jung ran against each other, splitting the opposition vote and enabling ex-general Roh Tae-woo, Chun's hand-picked successor, to win the election. This was also despite support from the first female presidential candidate, Hong Sook-ja, who resigned her candidacy in order to support Kim.

Merged with the ruling party: 1990-92 
On January 22, 1990, he merged his Democratic Reunification Party with Roh's ruling Democratic Justice Party to form the Democratic Liberal Party. Kim's decision angered many democratic activists who considered him a traitor but he maintained his political base in Busan and Gyeongsang. Kim chose to merge with Roh's ruling party in order to become Roh's successor in 1992, which he became the presidential nominee of the ruling Democratic Liberal Party.

Presidency (1993–98)
As the candidate of the governing party, he defeated Kim Dae-jung and businessman Chung Ju-yung, the boss of the chaebol group Hyundai in the 1992 presidential election. He was only the fourth civilian to hold the office on a non-interim basis, and the first elected to a full term since 1960.

Reforms
The Kim Young-sam administration attempted to reform the government and the economy. One of the first acts of his government was to start an anti-corruption campaign, which began at the very top, as Kim promised not to use political slush funds. The anti-corruption campaign was also part of an attempt to reform the chaebols, the large South Korean conglomerates which dominated the economy.

Kim's government required government and military officials to publish their financial records and introduced the “real-name” financial transaction system across the country, which made it difficult to open bank accounts under false names, precipitating the resignation of several high-ranking officers and cabinet members. This also made it difficult for chaebols to seek government favours by depositing money to politicians and officials under false and anonymous names, drastically curbing such practices. He had his two predecessors as president, Chun and Roh, arrested and indicted on charges of corruption and treason for their role in military coups, although they would be pardoned near the end of his term on advice of president-elect Kim Dae-jung. Kim did not stop there, his administration pursued chaebol bosses who paid these bribes to Chun and Roh, most prominently Lee Kun-hee of Samsung and Kim Woo-choong of Daewoo were prosecuted, although Lee's sentence was suspended and Kim did not serve his sentence.

Kim also purged politically minded generals of the Hanahoe clique who Chun and Roh hailed from which until that point, had continued to be deeply engaged in policymaking. Thus, Hanahoe was disbanded and the depoliticization of the military began under Kim.

Kim also granted amnesty to 41,000 political prisoners in March 1993 just after taking office, and removed the criminal convictions of pro-democracy protesters who had been arrested during the Gwangju massacre in the aftermath of the Coup d'état of December Twelfth.

However, Kim's anti-corruption message was damaged after his son was arrested for bribery and tax evasion related to the Hanbo scandal.

Economy
In addition to curbing corrupt practices of the chaebols, Kim encouraged them to become leaner and more competitive to succeed in the global economy, in contrast to the state-directed economic growth model of the preceding decades. Chaebols were criticized at that time for inefficiency and a lack of specialization. Kim released his "100-Day Plan for the New Economy" for immediate economic reform, intended to decrease inflation and eliminate corporate corruption. Another Five-Year Plan was also implemented, to encourage foreign investment as part of Kim's internationalization strategy. By 1996, per capita GNP exceeded US$10,000.

He launched a wave of anti-corruption reforms and introduced wide-ranging economic reforms aimed at easing domestic regulations and the labour code, encouraging foreign investment and promoting competition. He defended the interests of the chaebol by introducing new labour legislation. It facilitates dismissal procedures, calls into question the job guarantee enjoyed by some employees, increases the already very high legal working hours (54.5 hours in 1996), simplifies the replacement of striking workers by temporary workers and prohibits the creation of new unions. These measures were passed in seven minutes on December 26, 1996, during a secret session of Parliament, in the absence of opposition members.

North Korea

In 1994, when American president Bill Clinton mulled over attacking Nyongbyon, the centre of North Korea's nuclear program, Kim advised him to back down, fearing a war. A US aircraft carrier and a cruiser had been deployed near South Korea’s east coast in preparation for a possible airstrike, and the United States planned to evacuate Americans, including US troops and their families, Kim said in a memoir. Kim understood that South Korean cities would be bombarded first by North Korea in the event of a strike and saw it necessary to stop any move that could start a war.

Japan
Kim took an upfront and straightforward attitude in his diplomacy toward Japan, with his quote “We will teach them to have manners once and for all,” referring to Japanese politicians who defended Japan’s wartime atrocities during World War II.

1997 IMF Crisis

Kim spent his final year in office, with the nation saddled by an economic crisis.

By 1996 and 1997, the banking sector was burdened with non-performing loans as its large chaebols were funding aggressive expansions. During that time, there was a haste by chaebols to compete and expand on the world stage, and Kim's 1993 financial reforms which allowed for the growth of merchant banks and short term loans fuelled increased borrowing by these companies. Many businesses ultimately failed to ensure returns and profitability. The chaebols continued to absorb more and more capital investment. Eventually, excess debt led to major failures and takeovers. The Hanbo scandal which involved Kim's son in early 1997 exposed South Korea's economic weaknesses and corruption problems to the international financial community. Hanbo was the first to declare bankruptcy in January 1997, sparking a domino effect. Kim's government was seen as indecisive in the face of crisis as the financial tsunami began. The next big chaebol to go, was in July 1997 when South Korea's third-largest car maker, Kia Motors, asked for emergency loans. The Kim government refused to bail them out on Kia's terms, and nationalized it in October 1997. The domino effect of collapsing large South Korean companies drove interest rates up and international investors away.

In the wake of the Asian market downturn, Moody's lowered the credit rating of South Korea from A1 to A3, on 28 November 1997, and downgraded again to B2 on 11 December. That contributed to a further decline in South Korean shares since stock markets were already bearish in November. The Seoul stock exchange fell by 4% on 7 November 1997. On 8 November, it plunged by 7%, its biggest one-day drop to that date. And on 24 November, stocks fell a further 7.2% on fears that the IMF would demand tough reforms. Other prominent chaebols were affected: Samsung Motors' $5 billion venture was dissolved due to the crisis, and eventually Daewoo Motors was sold to the American company General Motors (GM).

On 22 November 1997, Kim in a televised address to the nation, apologised and called for the nation to tighten its belts. He blamed companies for borrowing too much, workers for demanding too much pay and conceded that his government did not implement strong reforms on its own due to pressure from special interest groups. As a result, Kim became the most unpopular president in history with an approval rating of 6%, until Park Geun-hye broke this record with a 5% rating in 2016 before her impeachment. This is until she reached a record low of 1 to 3%.

On 3 December 1997, the International Monetary Fund (IMF) agreed to provide US$58.4 billion as a bailout package. In return, Korea was required to take restructuring measures. In addition, the Korean government started financial sector reform program. Under the program, 787 insolvent financial institutions were closed or merged by June 2003.

The South Korean won, meanwhile, weakened to more than 1,700 per U.S. dollar from around 800, but later managed to recover. However, like the chaebol, South Korea's government under Kim did not escape unscathed. Its national debt-to-GDP ratio more than doubled (approximately 13% to 30%) as a result of the crisis.

Later life, post-presidency (1998-2015) and death

Kim could not run for re-election; the South Korean constitution limits the president to a single five-year term. His term ended on 24 February 1998, and he was succeeded by his political rival Kim Dae-jung who defeated the ruling conservative party in the 1997 South Korean presidential election. This marked the first peaceful transition of power from one president to another from an opposition party in South Korea's history.

After his presidency, Kim traveled the world promoting democracy, and speaking at events such as Towards a Global Forum on New Democracies in Taiwan in January 2007.

He died in Seoul National University Hospital on 22 November 2015, from heart failure, at the age of 87. On 26 November 2015, a televised state funeral was held for Kim at the National Assembly lawn, during which Prime Minister Hwang Kyo-ahn delivered the opening remarks. Later that day, Kim was buried in the Seoul National Cemetery near former presidents Syngman Rhee, Park Chung-hee and Kim Dae-jung.

Awards

National honours
:
 Recipient of the Grand Order of Mugunghwa'
 First Class of the Order of Merit for National Foundation
 First Class of the Order of Civil Merit
	First Class of the Order of Military Merit
 First Class of the Order of National Security Merit
 Grand Gwanghwa Medal of the Order of Diplomatic Service Merit

Foreign honours
:
 Honorary Recipient of the Order of the Crown of the Realm
:
 Grand Cross of the Order of the Sun of Peru
:
	Grand Collar of the Order of Sikatuna
:
 Grand Cross of the Order of Merit of the Republic of Poland
:
 Grand Cross of the Order of Good Hope
:
	Collar of the Order of Civil Merit
:
 Second Class of the Order of Prince Yaroslav the Wise

Personal life
Kim was a member of the Chunghyun Presbyterian Church and was fluent in Japanese in addition to his native language, Korean. He was married to Son Myung-soon. He was survived by his children, two sons and three daughters, as well as his five younger sisters.

When he was in office, his public speeches were the subject of much scrutiny and his pronunciation of Gyeongsang dialect elicited both criticism and amusement. He once mistakenly pronounced '경제 (Gyeongje, 經濟: meaning 'economy')' as '갱제 (Gaengje: a Gyeongsang pronunciation of the older generation for '경제')' and '외무부 장관 (oemubu-janggwan, 外務部長官: meaning 'foreign minister')' as '애무부 장관 (aemubu-janggwan, 愛撫部長官: meaning 'making out minister')'. A humorous anecdote arose from another of his public speeches where audiences were said to have been surprised to hear that he would make Jeju a world-class 'rape' (관광, 觀光 [gwan gwang, tourism] > 강간, 強姦 [gang-gan, rape]) city by building up an 'adultery' (관통하는, 貫通- [gwantonghaneun, going-through]) > 간통하는, 姦通- [gantonghaneun, adulterous]) motorway.

References

External links

 Kim Young-Sam Memorial Museum 
 Kim Young-Sam, Hunjunghwe 

 
1929 births
2015 deaths
People from Geoje
South Korean civil rights activists
South Korean democracy activists
Presidents of South Korea
Korean religious leaders
Members of the National Assembly (South Korea)
Seoul National University alumni
South Korean Presbyterians
Liberal Party (South Korea) politicians
Democratic Party (South Korea, 1955) politicians
Conservatism in South Korea
Liberalism in South Korea
Kyungnam High School alumni
Recipients of the Order of Merit for National Foundation
Recipients of the Order of Military Merit (Korea)
Grand Crosses of the Order of the Sun of Peru
Grand Crosses of the Order of Merit of the Republic of Poland
Order of Civil Merit members
Recipients of the Order of Prince Yaroslav the Wise, 2nd class
Burials at Seoul National Cemetery
Recipients of the Order of Prince Yaroslav the Wise, 1st class